Denuwan Fernando (born 26 February 1989) is a Sri Lankan first-class cricketer. He was part of Sri Lanka's squad for the 2008 Under-19 Cricket World Cup.

References

External links
 

1989 births
Living people
Sri Lankan cricketers
Bloomfield Cricket and Athletic Club cricketers
Burgher Recreation Club cricketers
People from Western Province, Sri Lanka